Babak Farhoudi (born September 9, 1985) is an Iranian former swimmer, who specialized in sprint freestyle events. Farhoudi qualified for the men's 100 m freestyle at the 2004 Summer Olympics in Athens, by receiving a Universality place from FINA, in an entry time of 53.76. He challenged seven other swimmers in heat two, including three-time Olympian Aleksandr Agafonov of Uzbekistan. He edged out Monaco's Jean Laurent Ravera to save a seventh spot by five hundredths of a second (0.05) in 56.42. Farhoudi failed to advance to the semifinals, as he placed sixty-first overall out of 71 swimmers in the preliminaries.

References

1985 births
Living people
Iranian male freestyle swimmers
Olympic swimmers of Iran
Swimmers at the 2004 Summer Olympics